The Victory Monument is a monument in Bolzano, northernmost Italy, erected on the personal orders of Benito Mussolini in South Tyrol, which had been annexed from Austria after World War I. The 19 metre wide Victory Gate was designed by architect Marcello Piacentini and substituted the former Austrian Kaiserjäger monument, torn down in 1926–27. Its construction in Fascist style, displaying lictorial pillars, was dedicated to the "Martyrs of World War I".

The following Latin script can be seen on the main façade:

Here at the border of the fatherland set down the banner. From this point on we educated the others with language, law and culture.

The monument was inaugurated on 12 July 1928 by King Victor Emmanuel III and major representatives of the fascist government.

The inscription, referring to Roman imperial history, was seen as provocative by many within the German-speaking majority in the province of South Tyrol. On the day of the inauguration there was a counter-demonstration with 10,000 people in Innsbruck.

Since its construction, the monument has been a focal point of the tensions between the Italian and German speaking communities in Bolzano and in the whole region; after various attempts to blow it up carried out by South Tyrolean separatist groups in the late 1970s, it has been fenced off to protect it from further defacement.

Only in 2014, by a joint decision taken by the Italian Ministry of Culture, the South Tyrolean Provincial Government and the Municipality of Bolzano, the Monument has been reopened to the public along with a permanent exhibition (under the title "BZ '18–'45: one monument, one city, two dictatorships") focussing on the history of the monument, within the context of Fascism and the Nazi occupation.

In 2016, the exhibition was granted a special commendation by the Judging Panel of the European Museum of the Year Award which pointed out that "the exhibition reintegrates a controversial monument, which has long served as the focal point of battles over politics, culture, and regional identity. The project is a highly courageous and professional initiative to promote humanism, tolerance and democracy."

Similarly to the Victory Monument, in 2017 also the former Casa del Fascio and its monumental fascist bas-relief have been recontextualized on behalf of the Provincial Administration by adding an illuminated inscription quoting Hannah Arendt.

Further reading
 Hökerberg, Håkan (2017), "The Monument to Victory in Bolzano: desacralisation of a fascist relic", in International Journal of Heritage Studies, vol. 24, pp. 1–16.
 
 
 Di Michele, Andrea (2020), "Storicizzare i monumenti fascisti. Il caso di Bolzano", in Geschichte und Region/Storia e regione, vol. XXIX, 2, pp. 149–67; also in English transl. (2022), "Fascist Monuments on the Border. The Case of Bolzano/Bozen, South Tyrol", in Andrea Di Michele, Filippo Focardi (eds.), Rethinking Fascism. The Italian and German Dictatorships, Berlin/Boston, de Gruyter, pp. 247–74. https://doi.org/10.1515/9783110768619-013
 Schnapp, Jeffrey (2020), "Small Victories («BZ ’18–’45»)", in Kay Bea Jones, Stephanie Pilat (eds), The Routledge Companion to Italian Fascist Architecture. Reception and Legacy, Routledge, London-New York. , pp. 533–45.

References

External links 
 Official Website

See also
 Timeline of Bolzano
 History of South Tyrol

Buildings and structures in Bolzano
Monuments and memorials in Trentino-Alto Adige
World War I memorials in Italy
Italian fascist architecture
Buildings and structures completed in 1928
Tourist attractions in South Tyrol